Lophius budegassa, the blackbellied angler, is a species of anglerfish in the family Lophiidae. It was described by Maximilian Spinola in 1807. It is also found off the coast of Senegal and in Mediterranean Sea. In regard to the length frequency distribution, the Mediterranean International Trawl Survey's (MEDITS) data sets of 1994–1999 show a clear predominance of the species smaller than 30 cm in the central and eastern Mediterranean (Ionian, Adriatic, and Aegean seas). It has also been found that the spawning period of this species occurs over several months; furthermore, the growth rate of juveniles has been shown to be faster than previously expected.

References

Fish described in 1807
Fish of West Africa
Taxa named by Maximilian Spinola
budegassa